Hypnos is the debut album by American singer and songwriter Ravyn Lenae. It was released on May 20, 2022, through Atlantic Records. The album includes guest appearances and production from Monte Booker, Steve Lacy, Kaytranada, Fousheé, Mereba, Smino, Sango, Luke Titus, IAmNobodi, Phoelix and Teo Halm. The artwork of the album was shot by Quil Lemons.

Background
The album was recorded over a four-year period during which Washington relocated to Los Angeles following the COVID-19 pandemic.

Musical style 
Hypnos is primarily an alternative R&B record with elements of dance music, R&B, house music, soul music, and Afrobeat.

Singles and promotion
On February 1, 2022, the first single, "Skin Tight", featuring Steve Lacy was released alongside the music video. On March 18, 2022, Washington released the second single "Light Me Up" with the video. On April 19, 2022, Washington released the third single "M.I.A." On May 17, 2022, Washington released the fourth and final single "Xtasy" produced by Kaytranada. On September 14, 2022, she released a remix of "Xtasy" featuring Doechii.

Tour
Washington announced a tour spanning 16 cities beginning at Neumos in Seattle, Washington. A special guest, Unusual Demont, will support the tour.

Critical reception

Hypnos has received critical acclaim with many publications naming it one of the best albums of 2022.

Gio Santiago for Pitchfork gave the album a "Best New Music" designation, writing that it "arrives as a mature reintroduction, a love-stained, moody transport that flies through Lenae’s world with a featherlight cadence. Lenae surveys the recent history of soul, alternative R&B, and even Afrobeats with precision. But most importantly, her debut showcases her ascendant vocal prowess as she moves across her wide range with ease. Lenae’s transcendental poise establishes her as a resonant voice in R&B. Even as she touches on trends and familiar themes, it’s Lenae’s delivery, confidence, and alluring presence that makes HYPNOS stand apart. As she considers her anxieties, hopes, and doubts, she reveres the musical icons before her in ways that show just how ready she is for her own turn."

Rob Murray for Clash opined: "Her first major project since 2018, 'Hypnos' has the feeling of creative release, a sense of emotions expunged and experiences extinguished. A gorgeous listen with a deep, lasting resonance, 'Hypnos' finds Ravyn Lenae rising to the challenge of her peers, and raising the bar once more."

Jasleen Dhindsa for Loud and Quiet called Hypnos "a colourful and other-worldly debut, aligning with its obvious influences but also way beyond that, capturing the same unconventional essence as Janet Jackson in her '90s prime. Ravyn Lenae is invigorating and distorting R&B, fit for her Gen Z digital milieu."

Andrew Sacher for BrooklynVegan felt that Hypnos "largely follows the atmospheric, lightly psychedelic, downtempo R&B carved out by artists like SZA, Tinashe, and the self-titled Beyoncé album, and Ravyn's got exactly the right soaring voice and lush production style to pull it off. The whole album sounds gorgeous, and there are a handful of songs that pop out on early listens. A full-length album has been a long time coming for Ravyn, and Hypnos was worth the wait."

Mya Abraham for Vibe writes "[Lenae] provides an elevated ascension with her new offering while remaining true to her core."

Year-end lists

Track listing

Personnel

Musicians
 Ravyn Lenae – vocals, writing, engineer (tracks 3, 8, 11, 16)
 Luke Titus – production (tracks 1, 3, 6, 10, 13–16), additional production (track 5), writing (tracks 5, 12)
 Steve Lacy – production (tracks 1, 5, 7, 10, 12–13) vocals (track 5), writing (tracks 5, 12)
 Monte Booker – production (tracks 2, 8–9, 11)
 Phoelix – production (tracks 3, 7, 9), writing (track 12)
 Teo Halm – production (tracks 3, 6)
 IAMNOBODI – writing (track 4), production (track 4)
 Sango – writing (track 4), production (track 4)
 KAYTRANADA – production (track 14)
 Foushee – featured artist (track 15), production (track 15)
 Mereba – featured artist (track 6)
 Smino – featured artist (track 9)
 Ambré – writing (track 4)
 Jean Deaux – writing (track 4)

Production
 J Soundz – engineer (tracks 4, 6, 9)
 Karl Wingate – engineer (tracks 1, 5, 10, 13)
 Tyler Karmen – engineer (tracks 7, 16)
 Bryan Schwaller – engineer (tracks 1–6, 10–11, 13–15), mixing (tracks 2, 8–10)
 Jeff Ellis – mixing (tracks 1, 3–7, 11–16)
 Dale Becker – mastering
 Noah McCorkle – assistant mastering
 Conner Hedge – assistant mastering (tracks 4, 12)

Design
 Quil Lemons – photographer
 Jeanie Annan-Lewin – creative director
 Jacob Aaron Dillon – hair stylist
 Laura Dudley – makeup artist

References

Ravyn Lenae albums
2022 debut albums